JoJo Maman Bébé is a multi-channel maternity wear and baby clothing retailer with stores in the United Kingdom. Founded as a mail-order seller in 1993, it was acquired in 2022 by Next and an investment group.

History 
JoJo Maman Bébé was launched in 1993 by Laura Tenison as a mail-order catalogue specialising in maternity wear and children's clothes, after she spent time in hospital following a car accident, where a young mother on her ward expressed frustration at the lack of variety in children's clothes available via mail order. As founder and managing director, Tenison was awarded an MBE for services to business in South Wales in 2004.

In addition to mail-order and online sales, the company later opened 45 brick and mortar stores by March 2012  and 87 by April 2022. In addition to a buying, design and marketing office registered in Battersea, London, the company also has a second operational facility in Newport, Wales.

The company was acquired in April 2022 by Next plc and an investment group led by the hedge fund Davidson Kempner, with Tenison stepping down as CEO and commercial director Gwynn Milligan succeeding her.

Products 
In the world of mother and baby fashion, JoJo Maman Bébé is a specialist boutique. The initial product range was heavily inspired by traditional French Breton-style nautical clothing, a theme that became part of the company's brand image, followed by an expansion into a broader range of baby, children's and maternity clothing. It also sells nursery products, gifts and toys for babies, toddlers and pre-schoolers.

Awards 
The company has been nominated for several distinctions, including: 
HIT Heroes, Best Community Outreach Employer of the Year, 2023
Dotties Awards, Best Performing Campaign of the Year by an Ecommerce Brand, 2022
Progressive Preschool, Best Multiple Retailer of Preschool Products 2022
Family Awards Gold Winner, Best Toddler Fashion Brand, 2018
Ecomd Direct Commerce Awards, Best Overall Business and Outstanding Customer Service, 2017
NPPA Ireland, Best Health and Well Being Product for Mum (Breastfeeding Pillow), 2017
Progressive Preschool, Best Preschool Retailer and Best Multiple Retailer Initiative, 2017
Zazu, Best Retailer Award, 2016
Little London, Best Maternity Fashion, 2016
Little London Magazine, Best Online Retailer, 2015
Circular Economy Champions Awards, 2015
Leading Wales Awards, Best Company Award 2010
Prima Baby Reader Awards, Best Children's Wear Website and Best Maternity Lingerie, 2010
Drapers Children's Wear Retailer of the Year 2009
Prima Baby Fashion Awards, Best Catalogue/Mail-order Service 2008
Member of Courvoisier Future 500 of Fashion & Retail 2007
Pregnancy & Birth Best for Underwear Bloom Award 2007
Prima Baby Pregnancy Reader Awards Best Buy, Mail Order 2007
Fast Growth Business Awards, Retail/Leisure Female Entrepreneur and Retail Business of the Year, 2007
Practical Parenting Baby & Toddler Fashion Award and Maternity Fashion Award, 2007
Nominated a Superbrand in 2005

Social Responsibility 
To reduce the company's environmental impact, JoJo Maman Bébé supports a number of initiatives. These include the use of renewable energy in stores, planting in partnership with Stump Up For Trees, and use of sustainable and recycled materials such as FSC-certified wood in clothing and toys.

With a B Corp (Better Corporation) certification earned in 2016, the company demonstrates a commitment to people, planet and profit. Donation and community grant campaigns such as From A Mother To Another  and Helping Hands  support this pledge.

References

External links 
 Official website

1993 establishments in the United Kingdom
Maternity clothing
Clothing retailers of the United Kingdom
Clothing companies established in 1993
Retail companies established in 1993
Companies based in London
Clothing companies based in London
1990s fashion